The National Hsinchu Living Arts Center (NHLAC) is an arts center in East District, Hsinchu City, Taiwan.

History
The center building was originally constructed in 1921 during the Japanese rule. The center was officially opened on 6 March 2008 to promote living arts, cultural and creative industries and community development.

Architecture
The center was designed with Taiwanese and Western architectural style.

Transportation
The center is accessible within walking distance northwest of Hsinchu Station of Taiwan Railways.

See also
 List of tourist attractions in Taiwan

References

External links

 

2008 establishments in Taiwan
Art centers in Hsinchu
Buildings and structures completed in 1921